Wheelchair tennis event at the 2015 Parapan American Games was played from 8 to 14 August 2015 at the University of Toronto Scarborough Tennis Centre in Toronto. 

The original competition was proposed to be held at Rexall Centre, consistent with the Games' venue plan in hosting Paralympic sport at the same venue as their Olympic counterpart. However, the Parapan American Games schedule conflicted with 2015 Rogers Cup's women competition and the wheelchair tennis competition was forced to relocate. As a result, the University of Toronto Scarborough Tennis Centre was constructed for the wheelchair tennis competition.

Medal summary

Medal table

Medal events

References

Wheelchair tennis
Parapan American Games
2015